Anosibe Ifody is a town and commune in Madagascar. It belongs to the district of Moramanga, which is a part of Alaotra-Mangoro Region. The population of the commune was estimated to be approximately 6,000 in 2001 commune census.

Primary and junior level secondary education are available in town. The majority 99% of the population of the commune are farmers.  The most important crops are rice and bananas, while other important agricultural products are beans and cassava.  Services provide employment for 1% of the population.

References and notes 

Populated places in Alaotra-Mangoro